Terra II or Terra 2 may refer to:

 A fictional planet in the Japanese anime series Saber Marionette J
 The second fictional character to be called Terra in DC Comics
 A play-by-mail game, Terra II, published by Clemens & Associates.
 Philosophical context created by the Brazilian psychoanalyst Jorge Forbes.
 TV program created and broadcast by the Brazilian Network Tv Cultura, with the psychoanalyst Jorge Forbes.